Amblyseius sellnicki is a species of mite in the family Phytoseiidae.

References

sellnicki
Articles created by Qbugbot
Animals described in 1960
Taxa named by Wolfgang Karg